Żaklin Nastić (born 29 January 1980) is a German politician who represents The Left. She has served as a member of the Bundestag from the state of Hamburg since 2017.

Life 
Born in Gdynia, Poland, Żaklin Nastić came to Hamburg in 1990 and later studied Slavic Studies. She became member of the bundestag after the 2017 German federal election. She is a member of the Committee on Human Rights and Humanitarian Aid.

She rejects military support for Ukraine and spoke at a "No more weapons to Ukraine" rally in Berlin on 27 January 2023.

References

External links 

  
 Bundestag biography 

1980 births
Living people
Members of the Bundestag for Hamburg
Female members of the Bundestag
21st-century German women politicians
Members of the Bundestag 2017–2021
People from Gdynia
Polish emigrants to Germany
Naturalized citizens of Germany
Members of the Bundestag for The Left
Members of the Bundestag 2021–2025